Chiriku Hachiman Shrine (千栗八幡宮, Chiriku Hachimangu) is a Shinto shrine located in Miyaki, Saga Prefecture, Japan. It is a Hachiman shrine, dedicated to the kami Hachiman. It was established in 724. Its main festival is held annually on September 15. It was formerly the ichinomiya of Bizen Province.

It was formerly a National Shrine of the Third (lowest) Rank (国幣小社, Kokuhei Chūsha) in the Modern system of ranked Shinto Shrines.

See also
Hachiman shrine

External links

Sightseeing website

Shinto shrines in Saga Prefecture
8th-century establishments in Japan
Hachiman shrines
8th-century Shinto shrines
Religious buildings and structures completed in 724

Beppyo shrines